Qaleh Miran Rural District is a rural district (dehestan) in the Central District of Ramian County, Golestan Province, Iran. At the 2006 census, its population was 2,983, in 703 families.  The rural district has 11 villages.

References 

Rural Districts of Golestan Province
Ramian County